The Birmingham Black Barons were a Negro league baseball team that played from 1920 until 1960. They shared their home field of Rickwood Field in Birmingham, Alabama, with the white Birmingham Barons, usually drawing larger crowds and equal press.

Founding 

Drawing largely from a successful American Cast Iron Pipe Company Industrial League team, the Black Barons were organized in 1920 for the inaugural season of Rube Foster's Negro Southern League, which operated mainly as a minor league. They played in that league for three years before making the leap to the larger Negro National League, which operated as a major league. They were unable to keep their position due to irregularities with the team finances and returned to the Southern League for three more years. Their return to the National League in 1927 was marked by the emergence of star pitcher Satchel Paige, who led the Black Barons to the second half pennant.  They lost the Negro National League title to the Chicago American Giants in four straight games.

Later years 

For the next decade or so they alternated leagues before being bought by Memphis, Tennessee funeral home director Tom Hayes in December 1939. The club joined the Negro American League in 1940. Early in the decade the team was sold again to Abraham Saperstein who also owned the Harlem Globetrotters basketball team. In 1943 and 1944 they won back-to-back pennants. Starting in 1945, they became full members of the Negro American League and continued their success, winning a third pennant in 1948 with the help of teenage outfielder Willie Mays. They ended up losing three Negro World Series to the Homestead Grays that decade, forging a notable rivalry. As the National and American Leagues started signing talented African American players, the Black Barons tried to form a new Negro Southern League with three other Southern teams.

The franchise was owned by William Bridgeforth from 1952 to 1955, and by Sid Lynor and Floyd Meshac in 1955. Dr. Anderson Ross purchased the franchise in 1956 and renamed the team the Birmingham Giants.

The Black Barons played their last game in 1960.

Throwback games 

The 1999 Rickwood Classic honored the Black Barons, with the Birmingham Barons and Huntsville Stars wearing throwback uniforms. Some 35 former Negro leagues players, including former Black Baron Charley Pride attended.

On February 26, 2006, ESPN Classic broadcast a throwback game from Rickwood Field featuring amateur players in the uniforms of the Birmingham Black Barons and fictitious "Bristol Barnstormers". The style of play, the equipment and the umpires all reflected the 1940s game. Willie Mays and Charley Pride were both in attendance. The Black Barons rallied to break an eighth inning tie and win the game, 9–8.

Notable players 

In addition to Satchel Paige, Willie Mays also played as center fielder during both the 1948 and 1949 seasons. Mule Suttles was a member of the Black Barons in 1924 and 1925 seasons. Suttles was elected to the Baseball Hall of Fame in 2006. Other players, like Artie Wilson, Bill Greason, and Jay Heard also saw limited time (under 20 games each) in the Major Leagues.

Hall of Fame players 

The following Black Barons players have been inducted into the National Baseball Hall of Fame in Cooperstown, New York.

Other star players 
 Dan Bankhead (1940–1942, 1944)
 Sam Bankhead (1931–1932)
 Lyman Bostock Sr. (1940–1942, 1946)
 Piper Davis (1942–1950)
 Bill Greason (1948–1949)
 Jay Heard (1946–1948)
 Jimmy Newberry (1944–1950)
 Charley Pride (1953)
 Artie Wilson (1944–1948)

Notes

References
 Fullerton, Christopher D. (1999). Every Other Sunday: The Story of the Birmingham Black Barons. Birmingham: R. Boozer Press. .
 Birmingham Black Barons at the Birmingham-Pittsburgh Traveler page - accessed April 3, 2006
 "Still in the Game" (April 2006) Southern Living.
 Jordan, Phillip (February 23, 2006). "Nine Innings in Rickwood". Birmingham Weekly.
 Daily Defender. Chicago, Ill.: 1962.

External links
 Franchise history at Seamheads.com

 
Negro league baseball teams
Sports teams in Birmingham, Alabama
1920 establishments in Alabama
1960 disestablishments in Alabama
Baseball teams established in 1920
Sports clubs disestablished in 1960
Professional baseball teams in Alabama
Defunct baseball teams in Alabama
Baseball teams in Alabama
Baseball teams disestablished in 1960